The Cadurci were a Gallic tribe dwelling in the later region of Quercy during the Iron Age and the Roman period.

Name 
They are mentioned as Cadurcus by Caesar (mid-1st c. BC), Kadou͂rkoi (Καδοῦρκοι) by Strabo (early 1st c. AD) and Ptolemy (2nd c. AD), and as Cadurci by Pliny (1st c. AD).

The etymology of the ethnonym Cadurci remains uncertain. Pierre-Yves Lambert has proposed to interpret it as a haplology (loss of syllabe) for the Gaulish compound Catu-turci ('battle-boars'), formed with the root catu- ('combat, battle') attached to the plural of turcos ('wild boar'). 

The city of Cahors, attested ca. 400 AD as civitas Cadurcorum ('civitas of the Cadurci', Cauricio in 1200, Caurs 1279), and the region of Quercy, attested in 565 AD as Cadurcinus (pagus Catorcinus in 628, Caercino in 1095, with Latin suffix -inus), are named after the Gallic tribe.

Geography 
The Cadurci dwelled in the region of Quercy. Their chief town was originally named Divona (present-day Cahors).

References

Bibliography 

 

 

Gauls